The men's discus throw event at the 2018 Asian Games was held on 29 August at the Gelora Bung Karno Stadium.

Schedule
All times are Western Indonesia Time (UTC+07:00)

Records

Results

References

External links
Results

Discus throw men
2018 men